Girltrash (stylized as Girltrash!) is a web series created by Angela Robinson. It originally aired on ourchart.com from June to August 2007. It stars Michelle Lombardo, Lisa Rieffel, Riki Lindhome, Rose Rollins, Gabrielle Christian and Mandy Musgrave.

Pilot
The series follows the lives of Tyler Murphy, Daisy Robson, and LouAnne Dubois, along with Misty Monroe and Daisy's little sister Colby. It is set in the Los Angeles criminal underworld with Tyler and Daisy chasing after LouAnne, a con artist who is on the run from Monique Jones from whom she stole money. LouAnne seduces Tyler. To make matters worse, Colby and Misty are being held hostage by Monique in order for Tyler and Daisy to finish their end of the deal.

The filmmakers ran out of funding before the project could be completed and the series remains unfinished.

Cast 
 Michelle Lombardo as Tyler Murphy
 Lisa Rieffel as Daisy Robson
 Riki Lindhome as LouAnne "Trouble" Dubois
 Rose Rollins as Monique Shaniqua Jones
 Gabrielle Christian as Colby Robson
 Mandy Musgrave as Misty Monroe
 Amber Benson as Svetlana "Lana" Dragovich
 Margaret Cho as Min Suk
 Maeve Quinlan as Judge Cragen
 Joel Michaely as Dryer Guy
 Jimmi Simpson as Valentine

Episodes

Film 
Girltrash: All Night Long is the musical prequel to Girltrash, starring Gabrielle Christian, Michelle Lombardo, Mandy Musgrave, Lisa Rieffel, Rose Rollins, Kate French, Malaya Drew and Clementine Ford. Girltrash: All Night Long was directed by Alex Kondracke and produced and written by Angela Robinson and Lisa Thrasher. Stacy Codikow, founder of Power Up was the executive producer.<ref>Riendeau, Danielle  2009 Year in Review: Movies " , '', 2009-12-15. Retrieved on 2010-03-21.</ref> Before the film's release controversy arose when creator, writer and producer Angela Robinson relinquished her association with the film stating "POWER UP is presenting a version of the film that I have not seen, that is unfinished and that has not been creatively approved by me as a result, I do not support nor validate any screenings or commercial sales of "Girltrash: All Night Long at this time."'' Codikow responded by stating that Robinson had in fact seen the final edit of the film. The film was released on February 1, 2014.

See also
List of lesbian, gay, bisexual, or transgender-related films by storyline

References

Lesbian-related television shows
American LGBT-related web series